Hanno Snyman (born ) is a South African rugby union player who last played for the Leopards in the Currie Cup. Hanno also played for a season at Scottish club Jed-Forest in the 2015/16 season. Hanno will be returning to play for the Gernika in the upcoming 2022-23 season. His regular position is hooker.

References

1995 births
Living people
Free State Cheetahs players
Jed-Forest RFC players
Leopards (rugby union) players
Rugby union hookers
Rugby union players from Bellville, South Africa
South African rugby union players